The following is the list of the 325 communes of the Loiret department of France.

The communes cooperate in the following intercommunalities (as of 2020):
Orléans Métropole
Communauté d'agglomération Montargoise et Rives du Loing
Communauté de communes de la Beauce Loirétaine
Communauté de communes Berry Loire Puisaye
Communauté de communes Canaux et Forêts en Gâtinais
Communauté de communes de la Cléry, du Betz et de l'Ouanne (partly)
Communauté de communes de la Forêt
Communauté de communes Giennoises
Communauté de communes des Loges
Communauté de communes du Pithiverais
Communauté de communes du Pithiverais-Gâtinais
Communauté de communes de la Plaine du Nord Loiret
Communauté de communes des Portes de Sologne
Communauté de communes des Quatre Vallées
Communauté de communes des Terres du Val de Loire (partly)
Communauté de communes du Val de Sully

References

Loiret